Mangharam Udharam Malkani (24 December 1896 – 1 December 1980) was an Indian scholar, critic, writer, playwright, literary historian and professor in the Sindhi language. He was the pioneer of modern Sindhi dramas. He was recognized as the "Grand old man of Sindhi literature".

Early life and education
He was born on 24 December 1896 at Hyderabad in the landlord family of Raisahab Udharam Malkani. Prof Malkani led a delegation of Sindhi writers for Asian Writers’ Conference held in 1956 in New Delhi.

Career

He joined D. J. Sindh College, Karachi as lecturer of English. He was the president of Sindhi Sahit Mandal (Sindhi literary Society). After the partition of India, he migrated to India where he joined Jai Hind College, Mumbai.

He wrote more than 22 books.

He wrote Sindhi Nasar Ji Tarikh (History of Sindhi Prose) for which he received a Sahitya Akademi Award in 1969.

He founded Sindhi Adabi Sangat.

Death

He died on 1 December 1980.

References

Sindhi people
Sindhi-language writers
1896 births
1980 deaths
Scholars from Mumbai
Indian literary critics
20th-century Indian dramatists and playwrights
Indian male dramatists and playwrights
Indian literary historians
D. J. Sindh Government Science College alumni
People from Hyderabad, Sindh
20th-century Indian historians
Recipients of the Sahitya Akademi Award in Sindhi
20th-century Indian male writers
20th-century Indian translators